2b Melbury Road is a Grade II listed house in Holland Park, London W14, built in 1877 by Sir John Belcher.

It was home to the sculptor Sir Hamo Thornycroft, to whom there is a blue plaque on the façade.

References

External links
 

Artists' studios in London
Houses completed in 1877
Grade II listed houses in the Royal Borough of Kensington and Chelsea
Houses in Holland Park
1877 establishments in England